Afzalur Rahman (1942 - 11 February 2021) was an MLA from 39 no. Jaleswar Vidhan Saba in 1978 from the Janata Party, in 1983 as an Independent, in both 1991 and 1996 from the Indian National Congress and in 2006 from Loko Sanmilon Party. He was also Pamchyet Minister of Assam.

References 

2021 deaths
1942 births
Janata Party politicians
Indian National Congress politicians
Date of birth missing
Place of birth missing
Place of death missing
Indian Congress (Socialist) politicians
Samata Party politicians
Assam MLAs 1978–1983
Assam MLAs 1983–1985
Assam MLAs 1985–1991
Assam MLAs 1991–1996
Assam MLAs 1996–2001
Assam MLAs 2006–2011